Darryl Jackson Shannon (born June 21, 1968) is a Canadian former professional ice hockey player. He was drafted 36th overall by the Toronto Maple Leafs in the 1986 NHL Entry Draft and as well as the Leafs, he played for the Winnipeg Jets, Buffalo Sabres, Atlanta Thrashers, Calgary Flames, and the Montreal Canadiens. Despite a serious illness, he played a total of 544 regular season games in the National Hockey League, scoring 28 goals and 111 assists for 139 points and collecting 523 penalty minutes.  He also played 29 playoff games, all with the Buffalo Sabres, scoring 4 goals and 7 assists for 11 points, collecting 16 minutes.  He moved to Germany in 2001 to play in the Deutsche Eishockey Liga for the Krefeld Pinguine and the Eisbären Berlin. He is the older brother of fellow former NHLer Darrin Shannon who played 
together while with the Winnipeg Jets.

Following his retirement, he lives in Buffalo, New York where he is an active member of the Sabres Alumni Association.

Career statistics

Regular season and playoffs

External links
 

1968 births
Living people
Atlanta Thrashers players
Buffalo Sabres players
Calgary Flames players
Canadian expatriate ice hockey players in Germany
Canadian ice hockey defencemen
Eisbären Berlin players
Ice hockey people from Ontario
Krefeld Pinguine players
Moncton Hawks players
Montreal Canadiens players
Newmarket Saints players
Quebec Citadelles players
Sportspeople from Barrie
St. John's Maple Leafs players
Toronto Maple Leafs draft picks
Toronto Maple Leafs players
Windsor Spitfires players
Winnipeg Jets (1979–1996) players